Phytophthora inflata is an oomycete plant pathogen. It was first identified in 1949 in Michigan, USA causing a pit canker on elm trees. It was found in the United Kingdom in 1992 in the roots of Sambucus tenuifolium and Lilac (Syringa vulgaris), in 2003 it was found in a UK nursery infecting Rhododendron ponticum. In the same year it was found in a nursery in Ohio also infecting Rhododendron.

References

External links
 Index Fungorum
 USDA ARS Fungal Database

inflata
Water mould plant pathogens and diseases
Tree diseases
Species described in 1949